Keenan Leigh Phillips (born 7 February 2000) is a South African soccer player currently playing as a right-back for SuperSport United.

Career statistics

Club

Notes

References

2000 births
Living people
South African soccer players
South Africa youth international soccer players
Association football defenders
South African Premier Division players
Bidvest Wits F.C. players
South Africa under-20 international soccer players